Henry Miller (31 December 1809 – 7 February 1888) was an Australian banker and politician, member of the Victorian Legislative Council.

Early life
Miller was born in Derry, Ireland, the son of Captain Henry Miller, of H.M.'s 40th Regiment of Foot, who served with distinction in the Peninsular War, and was at the battle of Waterloo, and his wife Jane, née Morpeth. In 1823 Miller senior proceeded with a detachment of his regiment in charge of a batch of convicts to Sydney, his family accompanying him.

Early career
Shortly afterwards Miller senior was appointed commandant at Moreton Bay, where he spent eighteen months, and was then transferred to Van Diemen's Land, where he died at Hobart in 1866. After the arrival of the family in what was afterwards Tasmania, Miller junior obtained an appointment as an accountant in the audit office at Hobart, and at the age of twenty-four married Eliza, second daughter of the late Captain Mattinson of the Merchant Service.

In 1839 Miller visited the Port Phillip District, and subsequently resigned his appointment in Tasmania, and came to Melbourne, where he settled at Richmond. He was one of the promoters of the Bank of Victoria, which was incorporated in October 1852, and was elected as the first chairman of directors, a post which he continued to occupy up till his death. He also originated a number of Insurance Companies and Building Societies.

Political career
On the separation of Port Phillip from New South Wales in 1851, Mr. Miller was elected to represent South Bourke, Evelyn and Mornington, in the original unicameral Victorian Legislative Council. In July 1852 Miller induced the Legislative Council to petition the Queen to authorise the establishment of a branch of the Royal mint in Melbourne. Miller supported the ballot, and on the inauguration of the constitution in 1856 he was returned to the Upper House for the Central province. On the formation of the first O'Shanassy Administration, in March 1858, Mr. Miller became Minister of Trade and Customs, and was sworn of the Executive Council, and elected to the Legislative Council for the Western province. In July 1866 he joined the first McCulloch Ministry as Commissioner of Railways, but on going before his constituents he was defeated, and resigned office in January 1867, retiring thenceforward from public life. Miller was a most successful speculator in Melbourne property, and having conducted his investments with marvellous prudence, died on 7 February 1888, at his property Findon (built by Stephen Henty) in Kew, Melbourne, leaving enormous wealth.

Family
Henry Miller married Eliza Mattinson (died 5 April 1892), daughter of Captain Mattinson, on 11 November 1834. Their children included:
William Henry Miller (c. 1839 – 20 September 1915) was a noted businessman; he was connected with the Bank of Victoria and a director of the AMP Society. He married; they had four sons and five daughters. 
Albert Miller (c. 1845 – 27 May 1915)
Sir Edward Miller (1848-1932), was a member of the Victorian Legislative Council for South Yarra Province 1892–1912.
Septimus Miller (1850 – 7 June 1925)
The Miller brothers were famous horsemen, known for hunting and steeplechasing, closely associated with their property Mill Park and the horse Redleap.

References

 

1809 births
1888 deaths
Members of the Victorian Legislative Council
Politicians from Derry (city)
Irish emigrants to colonial Australia
19th-century Australian politicians